AR, Ar, or A&R may refer to:

Arts, entertainment, and media

Music
 Artists and repertoire

Periodicals
 Absolute Return + Alpha, a hedge fund publication
The Adelaide Review, an Australian arts magazine
 American Renaissance (magazine), a white nationalist magazine and website
 Architectural Review, a British architectural journal
 Armeerundschau, a magazine of the East German army

Other media
 Ar, city on the fictional planet Gor
 a.r. group of Polish artists and poets, including Katarzyna Kobro
 Alternate reality (disambiguation), various fictional concepts

Business
 Accounts receivable, abbreviated as AR or A/R
 Acoustic Research, an American audio electronics manufacturer
 Aerojet Rocketdyne, an American aerospace and defense manufacturer
 Aerolíneas Argentinas (IATA airline code AR)
 Some Alfa Romeo car models, e.g. AR51
 Toyota AR engine

Language
 Ar, the Latin letter R when spelled out
 Ar (cuneiform), a cuneiform combined sign
 Arabic, by ISO 639-1 language code

Mathematics, science, and technology

Computing
 ar (Unix), a Unix archive format and handling tool
 Accelerated Reader, educational reading assessment software
 Augmented reality, an application of virtual reality in the real world

Biology and medicine
 Androgen receptor, a nuclear hormone receptor
 Aortic regurgitation, a heart valve disease
 Autosomal recessive inheritance

Mathematics
 ar-, a prefix of inverse hyperbolic functions
 Autoregressive model, concerning random processes in statistics

Physics and chemistry
 Aqua regia, a chemical mixture
 Archimedes number in fluid dynamics
 Argon, symbol Ar, a chemical element
 Aryl group in organic chemistry
 Relative atomic mass, symbolized as Ar

Other uses in science and technology
 Anti-reflective, coating of lenses
 Aspect ratio (aeronautics), of a wing

Military and weapons
 US Navy hull classification symbol for repair ships
 Armalite Rifle
 AR-15 style rifle, rifles based on ArmaLite's AR-15
 Army Reserve (Ireland), the land component of the Irish Reserve Defence Forces (RDF)

Places
 Ar (city), in ancient Moab
 Appenzell Ausserrhoden, Switzerland
 Province of Arezzo, Italy, vehicle registration code
 Argentina (ISO 3166-1 alpha-2 country code)
 .ar, the country code Top Level Domain for Argentina
 Arkansas, United States
 Armstrong–Ringsted Community School District, Iowa, United States

Politics and ethics
 Affirmative Repositioning, a political movement in Namibia
 Animal rights, a philosophy
 Animal rights movement, a social movement advocating for other animals
 Antipodean Resistance, an Australian neo-Nazi group

Other uses
 🜇 or AR, a numismatic abbreviation for "silver"
 Argent, the heraldic tincture of silver
 Assistant referee (association football)
 Auto rickshaw, a motorized three-wheeled vehicle common in South Asia
 Avis de réception, postal advice or acknowledgement of receipt